The Soviet Army or Soviet Ground Forces (SSV) was the main land warfare uniform service branch of the Soviet Armed Forces from 1946 to 1992.

Until 25 February 1946, it was known as the Red Army. In Russian, the term armiya (army) was often used to cover the Strategic Rocket Forces first in traditional Soviet order of precedence; the Ground Forces, second; the Air Defence Forces, third, the Air Forces, fourth, and the Soviet Navy, fifth, among the branches of the Soviet Armed Forces as a whole.

After the Soviet Union ceased to exist in December 1991, the Ground Forces remained under the command of the Commonwealth of Independent States until it was formally abolished on 14 February 1992. The Soviet Army was principally succeeded by the Ground Forces of the Russian Federation in Russian territory, and the rest of the ground forces by those of the post-Soviet states.

After World War II
At the end of World War II the Red Army had over 500 rifle divisions and about a tenth that number of tank formations. Their experience of war gave the Soviets such faith in tank forces that the infantry force was cut by two-thirds. The Tank Corps of the late war period were converted to tank divisions, and from 1957 the rifle divisions were converted to motor rifle divisions (MRDs). MRDs had three motorized rifle regiments and a tank regiment, for a total of ten motor rifle battalions and six tank battalions; tank divisions had the proportions reversed.

The Land Forces Main Command was created for the first time in March 1946. Marshal of the Soviet Union Georgy Zhukov became Chief of the Soviet Ground Forces in March 1946, but was quickly succeeded by Ivan Konev in July 1946. By September 1946, the army decreased from 5 million soldiers to 2.7 Million in the Soviet Union and from 2 Million to 1.5 Million in Europe. Four years later the Main Command was disbanded, an organisational gap that "probably was associated in some manner with the Korean War." The Main Command was reformed in 1955. On February 24, 1964, the Defense Council of the Soviet Union decided to disband the Ground Forces Main Command, with almost the same wording as in 1950 (the corresponding order of the USSR Minister of Defense on disbandment was signed on March 7, 1964). Its functions were transferred to the General Staff, while the chiefs of the combat arms and specialised forces came under the direct command of the Minister of Defence (Soviet Union). The Main Command was then recreated again in November 1967. Army General Ivan Pavlovsky was appointed Commander-in-Chief of Ground Forces with effect from 5 November 1967.

From 1945 to 1948, the Soviet Armed Forces were reduced from about 11.3 million to about 2.8 million men, a demobilisation controlled first, by increasing the number of military districts to 33, then reduced to 21 in 1946. The personnel strength of the Ground Forces was reduced from 9.8 million to 2.4 million.

To establish and secure the USSR's eastern European geopolitical interests, Red Army troops who liberated eastern Europe from Nazi rule, in 1945 remained in place to secure pro-Soviet régimes in Eastern Europe and to protect against attack from Europe. Elsewhere, they may have assisted the NKVD in suppressing anti-Soviet resistance in Western Ukraine (1941–55) and the Forest Brothers in the three Baltic states. Soviet troops, including the 39th Army, remained at Port Arthur and Dalian on the northeast Chinese coast until 1955. Control was then handed over to the new Chinese communist government.

Within the Soviet Union, the troops and formations of the Ground Forces were divided among the military districts. There were 32 of them in 1945. Sixteen districts remained from the mid-1970s to the end of the USSR (see table at right). Yet, the greatest Soviet Army concentration was in the Group of Soviet Forces in Germany, which suppressed the anti-Soviet Uprising of 1953 in East Germany. East European Groups of Forces were the Northern Group of Forces in Poland, and the Southern Group of Forces in Hungary, which put down the Hungarian Revolution of 1956. In 1958, Soviet troops were withdrawn from Romania. The Central Group of Forces in Czechoslovakia was established after Warsaw Pact intervention against the Prague Spring of 1968. In 1969, at the east end of the Soviet Union, the Sino-Soviet border conflict (1969), prompted establishment of a 16th military district, the Central Asian Military District, at Alma-Ata, Kazakhstan.

Cold War

Throughout the Cold War (1947–1991), Western intelligence estimates calculated that the Soviet strength remained ca. 2.8 million to ca. 5.3 million men. In 1989 the Ground Forces had two million men. To maintain those numbers, Soviet law required a three-year military service obligation from every able man of military age, until 1967, when the Ground Forces reduced it to a two-year draft obligation. By the 1970s, the change to a two-year system seems to have created the hazing practice known as dedovshchina, "rule of the grandfathers", which destroyed the status of most NCOs. Instead the Soviet system relied very heavily on junior officers. Life in the Soviet military could be "grim and dangerous:" a Western researcher talking to former Soviet officers was told, in effect that this was because they did not "value human life".

By the middle of the 1980s, the Ground Forces contained about 210 divisions. About three-quarters were motor rifle divisions and the remainder tank divisions. There were also a large number of artillery divisions, separate artillery brigades, engineer formations, and other combat support formations. However, only relatively few formations were fully war ready. By 1983, Soviet divisions were divided into either "Ready" or "Not Ready" categories, each with three subcategories. The internal military districts usually contained only one or two fully Ready divisions, with the remainder lower strength formations. The Soviet system anticipated a war preparation period which would bring the strength of the Ground Forces up to about three million.

Soviet planning for most of the Cold War period would have seen Armies of four to five divisions operating in Fronts made up of around four armies (and roughly equivalent to Western Army Groups). In February 1979, the first of the new High Commands in the Strategic Directions were created at Ulan-Ude. In September 1984, three more were established to control multi-Front operations in Europe (the Western and South-Western Strategic Directions) and at Baku to handle southern operations. These new headquarters controlled multiple Fronts, and usually a Soviet Navy Fleet.

From the 1950s to the 1980s the branches ("rods") of the Ground Forces included the Motor Rifle Troops; the Soviet Airborne Forces, from April 1956 to March 1964; Air Assault Troops (:ru:Десантно-штурмовые формирования Сухопутных войск СССР, from 1968-August 1990); the Tank Troops (see Russian Tank Troops); the Rocket Forces and Artillery (:ru:Ракетные войска и артиллерия СССР, from 1961); Army Aviation, until December 1990; Signals Troops; the Engineer Troops; the Air Defence Troops of the Ground Forces; the Chemical Troops, and the Rear of the Ground Forces.

In 1955, the Soviet Union signed the Warsaw Pact with its East European socialist allies, establishing military coordination between Soviet forces and their socialist counterparts. The Soviet Army created and directed the Eastern European armies in its image for the remainder of the Cold War, shaping them for a potential confrontation with the North Atlantic Treaty Organization. After 1956, First Secretary of the Communist Party Nikita Khrushchev reduced the Ground Forces to build up the Strategic Rocket Forces, emphasizing the armed forces' nuclear capabilities. He removed Marshal Georgy Zhukov from the Politburo in 1957, for opposing these reductions in the Ground Forces. Nonetheless, Soviet forces possessed too few theater-level nuclear weapons to fulfill war-plan requirements until the mid-1980s. The General Staff maintained plans to invade Western Europe whose massive scale was only made publicly available after German researchers gained access to National People's Army files following the dissolution of the Soviet Union.

In 1979, the Soviet Union entered Afghanistan, deploying troops after the deaths of some 100 Soviet personnel at the hands of the first major insurrection against the Marxist government in Afghanistan, as well as to support its Communist government, provoking a 10-year Afghan mujahideen guerrilla resistance. After Soviet general secretary Mikhail Gorbachev realised the economic,  diplomatic, and human toll the war was placing on the Soviet Union, he announced the withdrawal of six regiment of troops (about 7,000 men) on 28 July 1986. In January 1988 Foreign Minister Eduard Shevardnadze announced that it was hoped that "1988 would be the last year of the Soviet troops stay;" the forces pulled out in the bitter winter cold of January–February 1989.

Dissolution of the Soviet Union 

From 1985 to 1991, General Secretary Gorbachev attempted to reduce the strain the Soviet Armed Forces placed on the USSR's economy.

Gorbachev slowly reduced the size of the Armed Forces, including through a unilateral force reduction announcement of 500,000 in December 1988. A total of 50,000 personnel were to come from Eastern Europe, the forces in Mongolia (totaling five divisions and 75,000 troops) were to be reduced, but the remainder was to come from units inside the Soviet Union. There were major problems encountered in trying to organise the return of 500,000 personnel into civilian life, including where the returned soldiers were to live, housing, jobs, and training assistance. Then the developing withdrawals from Czechoslovakia and Hungary and the changes implicit in the Conventional Forces in Europe treaty began to create more disruption. The withdrawals became extremely chaotic; there was significant hardship for officers and their families, and "large numbers of weapons and vast stocks of equipment simply disappeared through theft, misappropriation and the black market."

In February 1989 Defence Minister Dmitri Yazov outlined five major points of planned military restructuring in Izvestiya, the Soviet official newspaper of record. First, the combined arms formations, divisions and armies, would be reorganised, and as a result division numbers would be reduced almost by half; second, tank regiments would be removed from all the motor rifle (mechanised infantry) divisions in East Germany and Czechoslovakia, and tank divisions would also lose a tank regiment; air assault and river crossing units would be removed from both Eastern Germany and Czechoslovakia; fourth, defensive systems and units would rise in number under the new divisional organisation; and finally the troop level in the European part of the USSR would drop by 200,000, and by 60,000 in the southern part of the country. A number of motor-rifle formations would be converted into machine gun and artillery forces intended for defensive purposes only. Three-quarters of the troops in Mongolia would be withdrawn and disbanded, including all the air force units there.

The Armed Forces were extensively involved in the 19–21 August 1991 Soviet coup d'état attempt to depose President Gorbachev. Commanders despatched tanks into Moscow, yet the coup failed. On 8 December 1991, the presidents of Russia, Belarus, and Ukraine formally dissolved the USSR, and then constituted the Commonwealth of Independent States (CIS). Soviet President Gorbachev resigned on 25 December 1991; the next day, the Supreme Soviet dissolved itself, officially dissolving the USSR on 26 December 1991. During the next 18 months, inter-republican political efforts to transform the Army of the Soviet Union into the CIS military failed; eventually, the forces stationed in the republics formally became the militaries of the respective republican governments.

After the dissolution of the Soviet Union, the Ground Forces dissolved and the fifteen Soviet successor states divided their assets among themselves. The divide mostly occurred along a regional basis, with Soviet soldiers from Russia becoming part of the new Russian Ground Forces, while Soviet soldiers originating from Kazakhstan became part of the new Kazakh Armed Forces. As a result, the bulk of the Soviet Ground Forces, including most of the Scud and Scaleboard surface-to-surface missile (SSM) forces, became incorporated in the Russian Ground Forces. 1992 estimates showed five SSM brigades with 96 missile vehicles in Belarus and 12 SSM brigades with 204 missile vehicles in Ukraine, compared to 24 SSM brigades with over 900 missile vehicles under Russian Ground Forces' control, some in other former Soviet republics. By the end of 1992, most remnants of the Soviet Army in former Soviet Republics had disbanded or dispersed. Military forces garrisoned in Eastern Europe (including the Baltic states) gradually returned home between 1992 and 1994. This list of Soviet Army divisions sketches some of the fates of the individual parts of the Ground Forces.

In mid March 1992, Russian President Boris Yeltsin appointed himself as the new Russian minister of defence, marking a crucial step in the creation of the new Russian armed forces, comprising the bulk of what was still left of the military. The last vestiges of the old Soviet command structure were finally dissolved in June 1993, when the paper Commonwealth of Independent States Military Headquarters was reorganized as a staff for facilitating CIS military cooperation.

In the next few years, the former Soviet Ground Forces withdrew from central and Eastern Europe (including the Baltic states), as well as from the newly independent post-Soviet republics of Azerbaijan, Armenia, Uzbekistan, Kazakhstan, Turkmenistan and Kyrgyzstan. Now-Russian Ground Forces remained in Tajikistan, Georgia and Transnistria (in Moldova).

Post-dissolution influence 
After the dissolution of the Soviet Union in 1991, a considerable number of weapons were transferred to the national forces of emerging states on the periphery of the former Soviet Union, such as Armenia, Azerbaijan and Tajikistan. Similarly, weapons and other military equipment were also left behind in the Soviet withdrawal from Afghanistan in 1989. Some of these items were sold on the black market or through weapons merchants, whereof, in turn, some ended up in terrorist organizations such as al-Qaeda. A 1999 book argued that the greatest opportunity for terrorist organizations to procure weapons was in the former Soviet Union.

In 2007, the World Bank estimated that out of the 500 million total firearms available worldwide, 100 million were of the Kalashnikov family, and 75 million were AKMs. However, only about 5 million of these were manufactured in the former USSR.

Equipment

In 1990 and 1991, the Soviet Ground Forces were estimated to possess the following equipment. The 1991 estimates are drawn from the IISS Military Balance and follow the Conventional Forces in Europe data exchange which revealed figures of November 1990.
 about 54,400 main battle tanks as of 1 June 1991, including 5,400 T-80/-M 9, 9,000 T-72L/M, 4,900 T-64, 8,500 T-62, 10,600 T-54/55, and a further 16,000 in store east of the Ural Mountains beyond the Conventional Forces in Europe treaty area, types unknown.
 About 1,000 PT-76 light amphibious tanks as of 1 June 1991, including about 410 inside the CFE treaty area.
 over 50,000 armored personnel carriers as of 1 June 1991, including BTR-80, BTR-70, BTR-60, BTR-D, BTR-50, BTR-152, and 4,500 MT-LB.
 about 28,000 armoured infantry fighting vehicles (AIFV), including BMP-1, BMP-2, BMP-3, about a total of 3,000 BMD-1, BMD-2, and BMD-3. Over 16,500 AIFV were inside the CFE treaty area.
 8,000 reconnaissance vehicles as of 1 June 1991 including 2,500 BRDM-2.
 33,000 towed artillery pieces, including 4,379 D-30, 1,175 M-46, 1,700 D-20, 598 2A65, 1,007 2A36, 857 D-1, 1,693 ML-20, 1,200 M-30, 478 B-4 howitzers and D-74, D-48, D-44, T-12, and BS-3 field/anti-tank guns.
 about 9,000 self-propelled howitzers, including 2,751 2S1, 2,325 2S3, 507 2S5, 347 2S7, 430 2S4, 20 2S19, 108 152 mm SpGH DANA, ASU-85 (including for Soviet Airborne Forces), and 2S9.
 8,000 rocket artillery pieces, of which about 2,330 were inside the CFE treaty area, including BM-21, 818 BM-27, 123 BM-30, 18 BM-24, TOS-1, BM-25, and BM-14 multiple rocket launchers.
 Scud, OTR-21 Tochka, OTR-23 Oka, and 9K52 Luna-M tactical ballistic missiles.
 1,350 2K11 Krug, 850 2K12 Kub, 950 9K33 Osa, 430 9K31 Strela-1, 300 Buk missile system, 70 S-300 (missile), 860 9K35 Strela-10, 20 Tor missile system, 130 9K22 Tunguska, ZSU-23-4, and ZSU-57-2 army air defense vehicles.
 12,000 towed anti-aircraft guns estimated in 1989. Types included ZU-23, ZPU-1/2/4, 57mm AZP S-60, 25mm 72-K, 61-K, 52-K, and KS-19.
 4,500 helicopters as of 1 June 1991, including some 2,050 armed helicopters, of which 340 were reported as Mil Mi-8; 290 Mil Mi-17; 1,420 Mil Mi-24; some experimental Mil Mi-28 "Havocs;" some 1,510 transport, of which 450 were reported as Mil Mi-6; 1,000 Mi-8; 50 Mil Mi-26 heavy; and 10 Mil Mi-10 heavy; 200 Mi-8 electronic warfare helicopters, including "Hip-G" and "Hip-K"; 680 general-purpose helicopters including 600 Mil Mi-2 and 80 Mil Mi-8.

The Stockholm International Peace Research Institute reported in 1992 that the USSR had previously had over 20,000 tanks, 
30,000 armoured combat vehicles, at least 13,000 artillery pieces, and just under 1,500 helicopters.

Commanders-in-Chief of the Soviet Ground Forces

 Georgy Zhukov, from 21 March 1946
 Ivan Konev, 1946–50
 position of commander of ground forces did not exist from 1950 to 1955
 Ivan Konev, 1955–56
 Rodion Malinovsky, 1956–57
 Andrei Grechko, 1957–60
 Vasily Chuikov, 1960–64
 position of commander of ground forces did not exist from 1964 to 1967
 Ivan Pavlovsky, 1967–80
 Vasiliy Petrov, 1980–85
 Yevgeny Ivanovsky, 1985–89
 Valentin Varennikov, January 1989 until 30 August 1991
 Vladimir Semyonov became Commander-in-Chief of the Ground Forces on 31 August 1991, and remained in that post until 30 November 1996.

See also
 Formations of the Soviet Army
 Military history of the Soviet Union
 Military ranks of the Soviet Union

Notes

References 
 
 
 Heuser, Beatrice, 'Warsaw Pact Military Doctrines in the 1970s and 1980s: Findings in the East German Archives,' Comparative Strategy, October–December 1993, pp. 437–457.

 
 
 
 
 
 
 
 
 
  For sale by the Supt. of Docs., U.S. G.P.O.

Further reading 
 Roy Allison, "Military Forces in the Soviet Successor States," International Institute for Strategic Studies, London, 1993.
 
 David M. Glantz (2010) The Development of the Soviet and Russian Armies in Context, 1946–2008: A Chronological and Topical Outline, The Journal of Slavic Military Studies, Volume 23, No.1, 2010, 27–235, DOI: 10.1080/13518040903578429. This chronological and topical outline describes the institutional and doctrinal evolution of the Soviet and Russian Armies from 1946 through 2009 within the broad context of vital political, economic, and social developments and a wide range of important international and national occurrences. Its intent is to foster further informed discussion of the subject. Each of the article's sub-sections portrays military developments in the Soviet or Russian Armies during one of the eight postwar periods Soviet and Russian military scholars, themselves, routinely identify as distinct stages in the development and evolution of their Armed Forces.
 Andrei Grechko (1977). The Armed Forces of the Soviet Union. English-language Soviet book put out by Progress Publishers.
 A.Y. Kheml (1972). Education of the Soviet Soldier: Party-Political Work in the Soviet Armed Forces. English-language Soviet book put out by Progress Publishers.

External links 
 
 Soviet Army rank insignia
 A Safeguard of Peace. Soviet Armed Forces: History, Foundations, Mission
 Soviet Armed Forces 1945–1991
 WW2 Soviet Army tank crew uniform and insignia

 
Disbanded armies
Military units and formations established in 1946
Military units and formations disestablished in 1991
1946 establishments in the Soviet Union
1991 disestablishments in the Soviet Union